Sofala is a village in New South Wales, Australia,  north-west of Sydney, within Bathurst Regional Council. It is located beside the Turon River. Sofala is just off the Bathurst-Ilford Road, with only local traffic through the town itself.

History
Sofala came about as a direct result of the gold rush which had been spurred on when Edward Hargraves discovered gold at Summerhill Creek on 12 February 1851. By June of that year, thousands of people had set up mining operations in the valley, and both the Royal Hotel and a general store were built in 1851 to handle the increased demand. Initially, gold was found in the area known as Gold Point on the Turon River. When the alluvial gold ran out,  mining turned to quartz reef mining. The town was a centre of opposition to the gold licensing system in New South Wales at the time. A considerable proportion of the miners were Chinese.

Sofala Public School was established in 1878. There was an Anglican church and a Catholic convent. The Convent opened in 1872 and closed in 1909, although it was a church until 1970.

The Gas Hotel was one of the first two hotels licensed, in 1851. The Royal Hotel was established in 1862. There were also two other hotels in 1866, Sofala Inn and Barley Mow. The Barley Mow having a Cobb and Co booking office.

Now a private residence, the Post Office and telegraph office, built in 1879 operated until 1989.

Attractions today include the gold-rush-era Sofala Royal Hotel and the old gaol. Small-scale gold workings are still active in the town.  Sofala has been reported to be the oldest surviving gold-rush town in Australia. There are still gold prospectors who pass the time using metal detectors, gold pans, and sluice boxes to recover small quantities of gold dust.

Popular culture
Russell Drysdale's painting Sofala, a depiction of the main street of the town, won the Wynne Prize for 1947.

The 1974 Peter Weir film The Cars That Ate Paris was filmed in the town. Village scenes in the 1994 John Duigan film Sirens were also filmed in Sofala.

A noted business is Finglinna Studios, which supplies stained glass to churches and other public buildings.

Access
 From Bathurst, Sofala is around 50 km north along the sealed Bathurst-Ilford Road; from Sydney, around 30 km from Ilford.

Heritage listings
Sofala has a number of heritage-listed sites, including:
 Brucedale, 1361 Sofala Road: Grave of Windradyne
 216 Main Road, west of Sofala: Bridge over Turon River at Wallaby Rocks

Attractions
 Prospecting
 Authentic Gold Rush era establishments
e.g The Sofala Royal Hotel (est.1862)
 Walk along the Turon River
 Cycle
 Historical walks and tours
 Riverside campsites
 Old Gaol museum/cafe/accommodation
 Turon Technology Museum
 Tanwarra Lodge luxury accommodation

See also
 Hester Maclean
 Hill End
 Ilford
 Capertee
 Bathurst
 Australian gold rushes
 Gold mining

References

Further reading
Higgins, Matthew Gold & Water: A History of Sofala and the Turon Goldfield (1990),

External links

Towns in the Central West (New South Wales)
Central Tablelands
Australian gold rushes
Mining towns in New South Wales